Jericho Health Centre is a health centre on Walton Street in Oxford, England. It is named after the district of Jericho, just northwest of central Oxford. It is part of the United Kingdom's National Health Service (NHS).

In June 2012, New Radcliffe House, further south on the opposite side of Walton Street, on the Radcliffe Observatory Quarter development site, was completed by the construction company Longcross. The centre moved into the ground floor of this new building in 2012. The architects were Hawkins Brown, based in London, and the building cost £11 million. Its location has opened up a view of the historic Grade I listed Radcliffe Observatory from Walton Street. The building is owned by Oxford University and the ground floor is leased to the NHS.

There are two separate practices in the building: Dr Leaver and partners, and Dr Kearley and partners. The local district nurses and health visitors are also based in the building.

See also
 Family medicine
 General practitioner
 Primary care

References

External links
 Dr Laurence Leaver & Partners, Jericho Health Centre
 Dr Karen Kearley & Partners, Jericho Health Centre

2012 establishments in England
Buildings and structures completed in 2012
Buildings and structures in Oxford
Health in Oxfordshire
Health centers